Colin McCourt (born 11 December 1984) is an English middle distance runner.

In 2017 Colin hit the headlines for a bet he was undertaking. Having ballooned to 94 kg (14.8 stone) since retiring from athletics, he stands to win £1700 after finishing a 5k in under 16 minutes in 2017. If he failed he had to have the names of seventeen of his friends tattooed onto his back. He finished the race in 15:38 thus beating the bet significantly.

Achievements

References

External links
 

1984 births
Living people
English male middle-distance runners
Athletes (track and field) at the 2010 Commonwealth Games
Commonwealth Games competitors for England